Abre Campo is a city in the Brazilian state of Minas Gerais. The city belongs to the mesoregion of Zona da Mata and to the microregion of Manhuaçu. In 2020, its population was estimated to be 13,444.

See also
 List of municipalities in Minas Gerais

References

Municipalities in Minas Gerais